Melbuk-Khawnuam is a census village in the Champhai district of Mizoram, India. It is located in the Khawzawl R.D. Block.

The village comprises two neighbouring habitations: Melbuk and Khawnuam, which are located close to the Indo-Myanmar border, near Zokhawthar.

Demographics 

According to the 2011 census of India, Melbuk (Khawnuam) has 123 households. The literacy rate of the village is 76.92%.

References 

Villages in Khawzawl block